Sovetskaya Latviya was a major Russian-language newspaper in the Latvian SSR.

It was an official publication of the Central Committee of the Communist Party of Latvia and the sister newspaper to the Latvian-language daily, Cīņa. From 1969 onwards, it was also styled as an official organ of the Council of Ministers of the Latvian SSR as well.

History

1919, 1940–1941 
The newspaper that became Sovetskaya Latviya was first published in 1940, following the Soviet takeover of Latvia, and the establishment of a monopoly on power by the Communist Party.

During this first period, it was named Nasha Pravda (1919) and Proletarskaya Pravda (1940).

The purpose of Proletarskaya Pravda was to replace the influential, independent Russian-language newspapers, such as widely read liberal Segodnya (Today), with a Soviet-controlled one.

A literary journal with the title Sovetskaya Latviya appeared briefly in 1940–41, but only two issues (Dec. 1940 and Jan./Feb 1941) apparently saw light of day. This short-lived  periodical seems to have been little-known even to the Latvian Communist Party Central Committee, as a protocol from a meeting on 2 November 1940 includes the resolution: "Sovetskaya Latviya — clarify what kind of journal this is, as no-one has either seen it or read it."

The invasion of the USSR and occupation of Latvia by Nazi Germany in 1941 interrupted publication in Riga.

1944–1991 and after
In 1944, following the re-establishment of Soviet control over Riga and most of Latvia, the newspaper resumed publication in Riga under the name Sovetskaya Latviya.

Sovetskaya Latviya was a broadsheet that appeared daily, except Mondays. During the Soviet period, it dominated the Russian-language newspapers market in Latvia together with the Latvian Komsomol daily Sovetskaya Molodëzh''' (Soviet Youth). In 1975, its circulation was 107,500 copies.

During the late 1980s, Sovetskaya Latviya expressed an editorial line critical of the movement for re-establishing Latvia's independence, reflecting the stance of the Communist Party leadership around Alfrēds Rubiks.

Following Latvia's regaining of independence from the USSR, in October 1991 Sovetskaya Latviya changed its name to Panorama Latvii. The editorial line that harshly criticised the policies of the Latvian government was maintained, particularly concerning the treatment of Russians in Latvia. In 2002, the publisher has concluded an agreement on financial support with the Equal Rights party. Panorama Latvii'' ceased to be published in 2003.

See also
Eastern Bloc information dissemination

References

 

Defunct daily newspapers
Defunct newspapers published in Latvia
Eastern Bloc mass media
Newspapers published in the Soviet Union
Newspapers established in 1940
Publications disestablished in 1991
Russian-language newspapers published in Latvia
1940 establishments in Latvia
1991 disestablishments in Latvia